Greer is an unincorporated community in Mason County, West Virginia, United States.

The community derives its name from the local Greer Limestone Company.

The Mississippian tetrapod Greererpeton burkemorani was named after this community by Alfred Romer in 1969.

References 

Unincorporated communities in West Virginia
Unincorporated communities in Mason County, West Virginia